John Selwyn Gummer, Baron Deben,  (born 26 November 1939) is a British Conservative Party politician, formerly the Member of Parliament (MP) for Suffolk Coastal and now a member of the House of Lords. He was Conservative Party Chairman from 1983 to 1985 and held various government posts including Secretary of State for the Environment from 1993 to 1997.

Gummer stood down from the House of Commons at the 2010 general election and was appointed to the House of Lords as Lord Deben.

Lord Deben is Chairman of the UK's independent Committee on Climate Change. He also chairs the sustainability consultancy Sancroft International, recycler Valpak, and PIMFA (Personal Investment & Financial Advice Association). He is a director of The Catholic Herald and the Castle Trust – a mortgage and investment firm. He is a trustee of climate change charity Cool Earth, alongside the ocean conservation charity, Blue Marine Foundation.

Early life

Gummer was born in Stockport, Cheshire. He is the eldest son of a Church of England priest, Canon Selwyn Gummer, and his younger brother is Peter Gummer, Baron Chadlington, a PR professional.

Gummer attended King's School, Rochester, before going to Selwyn College, Cambridge, where he read History. Whilst there, as chairman of the Cambridge University Conservative Association and later President of the Cambridge Union Society, he was a member of what became known as the Cambridge Mafia – a group of future Conservative Cabinet ministers, including Leon Brittan, Michael Howard, Kenneth Clarke, Norman Lamont, and Norman Fowler.

Public life

Elections
First elected to Parliament at the 1970 general election, where he defeated sitting MP James Dickens in Lewisham West, Gummer had previously contested Greenwich in 1964 and 1966. He was unseated in February 1974 by Labour's Christopher Price who achieved a 3.4% swing compared with a 1.3% swing to Labour nationally, deciding not to stand for the seat in the second election that year.

In 1979, he returned to the House of Commons, securing Eye in Suffolk, following the retirement of veteran Tory MP Harwood Harrison. He held the constituency and its successor Suffolk Coastal until his retirement from the Commons in 2010.

In government
Gummer was Parliamentary Private Secretary to the Minister of Agriculture in Edward Heath's government, before being appointed Conservative Party Vice-Chairman – a position he held until the government's fall in 1974. Following his return to the House in the 1979 election, he held various government posts and was Conservative Party Chairman from 1983 to 1985 – an office he held at the time of the Brighton hotel bombing during the 1984 Conservative Party conference. He joined the Cabinet in 1989 as Minister of Agriculture, Fisheries and Food, moving to become Secretary of State for the Environment under John Major in 1993.

As Environment Secretary he introduced the Environment Act 1995 and the Landfill Tax, which was the first such environmental tax in the UK. The BBC Wildlife magazine described Gummer as the "Environment Secretary against which all others are judged", placing him as one of its top ten environmental heroes. In 1997, he was also awarded the Royal Society for the Protection of Birds Medal, and was described by Friends of the Earth as "the best Environment Secretary we've ever had".

He had responsibility for food safety during the mad cow disease epidemic in 1989–90 which eventually claimed 178 British lives. At the height of the crisis in May 1990, he attempted to refute the growing evidence for BSE/Creutzfeldt–Jakob disease by feeding his four-year-old daughter Cordelia a burger in front of press cameras.

Gummer opposed the reduction of beds at the Aldeburgh Cottage Hospital in July 2005.

In opposition

Gummer managed to hold onto his seat in the 1997 Labour landslide victory, albeit with a much reduced majority of 3,254. He subsequently became a backbencher and chairman of the All-Party Group on Architecture and Planning. During this time he pursued environmental causes, introducing an Early Day Motion on global warming to Parliament along with Michael Meacher and Norman Baker. He was also instrumental in the passing of the Climate Change Act of 2008.

Because of his environmental credentials, in 2005 David Cameron asked Gummer to chair the Quality of Life Policy Group with Zac Goldsmith as his deputy.

In 2009, Gummer was involved in the United Kingdom parliamentary expenses scandal, after claiming £36,000 for gardening over four years, as a parliamentary expense. Although the claims were encouraged and initially approved by the Parliamentary Fees Office, rules state claims should only be made on expenses essential to parliamentary duties.  He repaid £11,538 for gardening and household bills and donated £11,500 to charity, saying that he was paying above the minimum required in order to demonstrate "corporate social responsibility" for the expenses system. Subsequently, the Legg Report showed that 343 MPs had been asked to repay some money with Gummer paying the seventh highest figure.

House of Lords
It was announced that Gummer would be awarded a peerage in the 2010 Dissolution Honours List. On 21 June he was created a Life Peer as Baron Deben, of Winston in the County of Suffolk. He takes his title from the River Deben. He was introduced in the House of Lords the same day, supported by his brother, Lord Chadlington, and the composer Lord Lloyd-Webber.

As a pro-European moderate, Lord Deben supported Kenneth Clarke's leadership bids.

In September 2012, Lord Deben was confirmed as Chairman of the UK's independent Committee on Climate Change, succeeding Adair, Lord Turner. The committee advises the UK Government on setting and meeting carbon budgets and on preparing for the impacts of climate change.

Personal life

Lord Deben has been married to Penelope Gardner since 1977, and lives at Winston Grange, a Grade II listed property in Suffolk. They have four children, including Ben Gummer, who was MP for Ipswich from 2010, until he lost his seat in 2017.

He converted to the Catholic Church in 1992, having previously been a practising Anglican and a member of the General Synod of the Church of England. He has supported the creation of the Personal Ordinariate of Our Lady of Walsingham for former Anglicans who have, like him, joined the Catholic Church, including serving as an Honorary Vice-President of the Friends of the Personal Ordinariate of Our Lady of Walsingham.
In July 2018 he was awarded the Honorary degree of Doctor of Science (D.Sc) from the University of East Anglia.

Arms

See also 
 River Deben

Bibliography

 1966: When the Coloured People Come, by John Gummer, Oldbourne, 
 1969: To Church with Enthusiasm, by John Gummer
 1971: The Permissive Society: Fact or Fantasy?, by John Selwyn Gummer, Cassell, 
 1974: The Christian Calendar, by Leonard W. Cowie and John Selwyn Gummer, Weidenfeld & Nicolson, 
 1987: Faith in Politics: Which Way Should Christians Vote?, by John Gummer, Society for Promoting Christian Knowledge, 
 1990: Christianity and Conservatism, by John Gummer
 1997: Green Buildings Pay, edited by B. W. Edwards, foreword by John Gummer, Spon Press, 
 1998: From Earth Summit to Local Agenda 21: Working Towards Sustainable Development, edited by William Laffery, Katarina Eckerberg, William M. Laffery, foreword by John Gummer, Earthscan Publications, 
 1998: Precision Agriculture: Practical Applications of New Technologies, by John Gummer and Peter Botschek, The International Fertiliser Society, 
 Weekly columnist in Estates Gazette magazine

References

External links
 Debrett's People of Today
 Guardian Unlimited Politics – Ask Aristotle: John Gummer MP
 TheyWorkForYou.com – John Gummer MP
 
 BBC article on the burger / BSE story
 
 
 Castle Trust

|-

|-

|-

|-

|-

|-

1939 births
Living people
People from Cheshire
People educated at King's School, Rochester
Alumni of Selwyn College, Cambridge
British Secretaries of State
British Secretaries of State for the Environment
Conservative Party (UK) MPs for English constituencies
Deben
Honorary Fellows of Selwyn College, Cambridge
Life peers created by Elizabeth II
Converts to Roman Catholicism from Anglicanism
English Roman Catholics
Agriculture ministers of the United Kingdom
People from Mid Suffolk District
Presidents of the Cambridge Union
Members of the Privy Council of the United Kingdom
UK MPs 1970–1974
UK MPs 1979–1983
UK MPs 1983–1987
UK MPs 1987–1992
UK MPs 1992–1997
UK MPs 1997–2001
UK MPs 2001–2005
UK MPs 2005–2010
United Kingdom Paymasters General
Chairmen of the Conservative Party (UK)
Members of the General Synod of the Church of England